Tsui Lam Estate is a mixed TPS and public housing estate located to the west of Po Lam in Tseung Kwan O, New Territories, Hong Kong. It is the second public housing estate in Tseung Kwan O and is the only public housing estate in Tseung Kwan O not built on reclaimed land. It has a total of eight residential blocks completed in 1988. Some of the flats were sold to tenants through Tenants Purchase Scheme Phase 6B in 2005.

King Ming Court is a Home Ownership Scheme housing court in Tseung Kwan O near Tsui Lam Estate. It has three residential blocks built in 1988 and is the only HOS court in Tseung Kwan O built at a hill, but not on reclaimed land.

Houses

Tsui Lam Estate

King Ming Court

Demographics
According to the 2016 by-census, Tsui Lam Estate had a population of 14,897. The median age was 50.9 and the majority of residents (97.9 per cent) were of Chinese ethnicity. The average household size was 3 people. The median monthly household income of all households (i.e. including both economically active and inactive households) was HK$26,900.

Politics
For the 2019 District Council election, the estate fell within two constituencies. Tsui Lam Estate falls within the Tsui Lam constituency, which is currently represented by Daryl Choi Ming-hei, while King Ming Court falls within the Hong King constituency, which was formerly represented by Frankie Lam Siu-chung until July 2021.

See also

Public housing estates in Tseung Kwan O

References

Tseung Kwan O
Public housing estates in Hong Kong
Tenants Purchase Scheme
Residential buildings completed in 1988